This is a list of valleys in South Korea. A valley is a low area between hills, often with a river running through it. Some Korean valleys are similar to one-another in terms of their geographic features, although there is also significant variation in their formations.

List of valleys of North Korea
In western North Korea, significant agricultural activity occurs in the narrow river valleys, which have a rich and fertile soil content.

Most of the prison camps in North Korea are located in "remote mountain valleys completely shut off from the outside world and escape is virtually impossible."

List of valleys of South Korea
In South Korea, many valleys are surrounded by mountains with forests.
 Baekundong Valley

Seoul Special City
This is a list of valleys in Seoul Special City
 Wooyidong Valley
 Baeksasil Valley
 Samchunsa Valley
 Jinkwansa Valley
 Pyeongchang Valley

Incheon Metropolitan City
This is a list of valleys in Incheon Metropolitan City
 Hamhuhdongchun

Busan Metropolitan City
This is a list of valleys in Busan Metropolitan City
 Busan – the most densely built up areas of the city are situated in a number of narrow valleys between the Nakdong River and the Suyeong River, with mountains separating most of the districts.
 Jangansa Valley
 Daechunchun Valley

Ulsan Metropolitan City
This is a list of valleys in Ulsan Metropolitan City
 Jakchunjung Valley
 Suknamsa Valley
 Cheonjeonri Gaksuk Valley    
 Naewonam Valley

Gyeonggi-do
This is a list of valleys in Gyeonggi-do
 Baekun Valley
 Songchu Valley
 Myungji Valley
 Youngchu Valley
 Eurbi Valley
 Gogiri Valley
 Jungwon Valley
 Bigum Valley
 Sammaksa Valley
 Sanasa Valley
 Dongmak Valley
 Byukgae Valley
 Jijang Valley
 Tapdong Valley
 Myojuksa Valley
 Sudonggukmin Gwangwangji

Gangwon-do
This is a list of valleys in Gangwon-do:
 Heungjung Valley
 Murung Valley
 Sogeumgang Valley
 Deokpung Valley
 Kimsatgat Valley
 Geumdang Valley
 Yongso Valley
 Bupheung Valley
 Jindong Valley
 Misan Valley
 Duksanki Valley
 Dutayeon Valley
 Damtuh Valley
 Beobsuchi Valley
 Chunbuldong Valley
 Gwangduk Valley
 Yongsugol Valley
 Sutasa Valley
 Achimgari Valley
 Shindae Valley
 Sundam Valley
 Makdong Valley
 Jujungol Valley
 Misiryeong Valley
 Naerinchun Valley
 Eorayeon Valley
 Dankyunggol Valley
 Eoseongjeon Valley
 Bangdong Valley
 Gwangdaegok
 Suryumdong Valley
 Sugam Valley
 Jangjun Valley
 Chuneunsa Valley
 Naeri Valley
 Seobong Valley
 Namjeon Valley
 Naewun Valley
 Dunjeon Valley
 Chudae Valley
 Gumandong Valley
 Jinburyung Valley
 Gayadong Valley
 Yongdam Valley
 Chunmi Valley
 Haenggudong Valley
 Suhang Valley
 Jungbong Valley
 Samil Valley
 Danggol Valley
 Michungol Valley
 Hachuri Valley
 Eomdun Valley
 Bisugumi Valley
 Chungpyungsa Valley
 Byungjibang Valley
 Mansandong Valley
 Gowontong Valley
 Gwangchi Valley
 Baekdam Valley
 Donghwal Valley
 Saldun Valley
 Naepyeong Valley
 Jiam Valley
 Gongsujeon Valley
 Geumdae Valley

Chungcheongbuk-do
This is a list of valleys in Chungcheongbuk-do
 Songgae Valley
 Ssanggok Valley
 Mulhan Valley
 Dukdong Valley
 Hwayang Valley
 Mansu Valley
 Namchun Valley
 Seowon Valley
 Gallon Valley
 Darian Valley
 Yeongok Valley
 Saebat Valley
 Sunyoodong Valley
 Yongha Valley
 Neunggang Valley
 Sunam Valley

Chungcheongnam-do
This is a list of valleys in Chungcheongbnam-do
 Surak Valley
 Yonghyun Valley
 Surak Valley
 Gangdanggol Valley
 Sungjoo Valley
 Donghaksa Valley
 Nengchun Valley
 Jichun Valley
 Gapsa Valley
 Dorim Valley
 Shimyeondong Valley
 Myungdae Valley
 Hwajanggol Valley
 Jakchun Valley
 Sansuri Valley

Gyeongsangbuk-do
This is a list of valleys in Gyeongsangbuk-do
 Pochun Valley
 Ockgae Valley
 Yongchu Valley
 Chisan Valley
 Hawok Valley
 Chungsong Eoreumgol Valley
 Dongsan Valley
 Namsan Valley
 Gumhwa Valley
 Samgaeri Valley
 Sunyoodong Valley
 Bulyoung Valley
 Yangpichun Valley
 Shinsung Valley
 Ssangyong Valley
 Daegachun Valley
 Sogwangri Valley
 Banya Valley
 Binggae Valley
 Baeksuktan Valley
 Hebang Valley
 Sukchun Valley
 Samijung Valley
 Suha Valley
 Julgol Valley
 Baekchun Valley
 Bonshin Valley
 Gosun Valley
 Jukgae Valley
 Dukgu Valley
 Jubang Valley
 Sangbiri Valley
 Saejae Valley
 Eundal Valley

Gyeongsangnam-do
This is a list of valleys in Gyeongsangnam-do

Jeollabuk-do
This is a list of valleys in Jeollabuk-do

Jeollanam-do
This is a list of valleys in Jeollabnam-do

Jeju Special Self-Governing Province
This is a list of valleys in Jeju Special Self-Governing Province():

Unsorted
 South Valley Hamlet (Kongnam-ni)

Notes

References

Further reading

 
  – Includes a 1922 image of Korean villages in a valley

Geography of Korea

Valleys
Korea